Chadwell Heath station is on the Elizabeth line in Chadwell Heath, which straddles the London Borough of Redbridge and the London Borough of Barking and Dagenham in East London. Its three-letter station code is CTH and it is in Travelcard Zone 5.

The station was opened in 1864 by the Eastern Counties Railway.

History

Chadwell Heath Station was opened on 11 January 1864 and is built on the site of Wangey House, one of Dagenham's oldest buildings dating back to 1250. Wangey House was partly demolished when the Eastern Counties Railway built the line in the 1830s; the last surviving portion was demolished when the Great Eastern Railway widened the line in 1901.

Chadwell Heath was the focus for the housing estate temporary railway built for the construction of the Becontree estate in the period 1926–33.

In June 2017, new  trains began entering service in preparation for the opening of the Crossrail. New lifts, signage, help points, customer information screens and CCTV has been installed.

Services
The typical Monday-Friday peak is 11 trains per hour and off peak is 7. Saturday off-peak service is 7 trains per hour in each direction between Liverpool Street and Shenfield, reduced on Sundays to 6 per hour in each direction:

Connections
London Buses routes 62 and 368 serve the station by the nearby Chadwell Heath Station bus stop.

References

External links

 Excel file displaying National Rail station usage information for 2005/06 

Railway stations in the London Borough of Redbridge
Former Great Eastern Railway stations
Railway stations in Great Britain opened in 1864
Railway stations served by the Elizabeth line
Railway station
1864 establishments in England